Driftwood Township is one of twelve townships in Jackson County, Indiana, United States. As of the 2010 census, its population was 860 and it contained 365 housing units.

History
Cavanaugh Bridge, Joseph Jackson Hotel, Medora Covered Bridge, and Picnic Area-Jackson State Forest are listed on the National Register of Historic Places.

Geography
The stream of Mill Creek runs through this township.

Unincorporated towns
 Vallonia

Extinct towns
 Petersburg

Adjacent townships
 Brownstown Township (northeast)
 Grassy Fork Township (east)
 Monroe Township, Washington County (south)
 Jefferson Township, Washington County (southwest)
 Carr Township (west)

Cemeteries
The township contains four cemeteries: Empson, Harrell, Peters, and Smith.

Major highways
  Indiana State Road 135
  Indiana State Road 235

Education
Driftwood Township residents may obtain a free library card from the Brownstown Public Library in Brownstown.

References
 
 United States Census Bureau cartographic boundary files

External links
 Indiana Township Association
 United Township Association of Indiana

Townships in Jackson County, Indiana
Townships in Indiana